Sandra Hernández Rodríguez (born 25 May 1997) is a Spanish professional footballer who currently plays as a midfielder for Granadilla in the Spanish 1st Division.

Club career

Barcelona
As a youngster Hernández played futsal with both boys and girls before joining Sant Gabriel at the age of fifteen. Two years later she joined Barcelona's famed La Masia academy. She later debuted in the 2013–14 season and represented the club in the UEFA Women's Champions League. Hernández later went on to claim winners' medals in the Primera División, Supercopa de Catalunya and Copa de la Reina before joining Valencia in 2017.

Valencia
On 4 July 2017, Hernández signed a two-year deal with Valencia.

International career

In 2016, Hernández was part of the Spain squad who took part in the UEFA Women's Under-19 Championship where they ended as runners-up to France. She netted a hat-trick in Spain's thrilling 4–3 semi-final victory over the Netherlands and ended as the tournament's top goal scorer with five goals to her name. Hernández was also previously part of the Spain squads which ended as runners-up in the UEFA Women's Under-17 Championship,  FIFA U-17 Women's World Cup and the previous year's UEFA Women's Under-19 Championship.

Personal life

Hernández hails from a footballing family. Her father, Felipe "Tata" Hernández, represented Tenerife and Real Betis, amongst others, during his career.

Honours

Club
Barcelona
 Primera División:2014–15
 Supercopa de Catalunya: 2016
 Copa de la Reina:2016–17

International
Spain
 Cyprus Cup: Winner, 2018

References

External links
 

1997 births
Living people
Spanish women's footballers
Primera División (women) players
FC Barcelona Femení players
Valencia CF Femenino players
Footballers from the Canary Islands
Spain women's international footballers
Women's association football midfielders
CE Sant Gabriel players
UD Granadilla Tenerife players
People from La Palma
Sportspeople from the Province of Santa Cruz de Tenerife
Spain women's youth international footballers
21st-century Spanish women